The Jasper SkyTram is an aerial tramway on the mountain called The Whistlers near Jasper, Alberta, Canada. It is the highest and longest guided aerial tramway in Canada. It is a seasonal operation, running from late March to the end of October. It has been in operation since it was built in 1964.

References

External links

 

Aerial tramways in Canada
1964 establishments in Alberta
Transport infrastructure completed in 1964